Neal Joseph Conan III (November 26, 1949August 10, 2021) was an American radio journalist, producer, editor, and correspondent. He worked for National Public Radio for more than 36 years and was the senior host of its talk show Talk of the Nation. Conan hosted Talk of the Nation from 2001 to June 27, 2013, when the program was discontinued; with the discontinuation NPR announced that Conan would depart the network.

Early life
Conan was born in Beirut, Lebanon, on November 26, 1949.  His father, Neal Jr., worked as a physician and headed the medical center at the American University of Beirut; his mother, Theodora (Blake), was a housewife.  His family relocated to Saudi Arabia when Conan was a child, before moving to New Jersey and Manhattan.  He studied at Loomis Chaffee School and Riverdale Country School.

Career
Conan entered the world of radio broadcasting at the age of 17, volunteering at Pacifica Radio station WBAI-FM in New York. He then worked at public radio station WRVR-FM, where he met Robert Siegel. At the age of 27 Conan joined National Public Radio. Conan's initial assignment for NPR was as a producer of All Things Considered. Later, he covered the White House, the Pentagon, and the Department of State for the network.

During the 1991 Gulf War, the Iraqi Republican Guard detained Conan for a week. He and Chris Hedges of The New York Times were reporting on a Shia rebellion centered in Basra, Iraq.

In 2000, Conan took a break from his work as a broadcaster to serve as the stadium play-by-play baseball announcer for the Aberdeen Arsenal.  A year later, he published Play by Play: Baseball, Radio and Life in the Last Chance League, which described his experience.  On September 10, 2001, Conan began his work as host of Talk of the Nation. In 2008, investigative reporter James Ridgeway covered the Democratic primary elections for Mother Jones, filmed interviewing Mike Gravel in New Hampshire, while Gravel is being interviewed on the phone by Conan for Talk of the Nation.

NPR announced that it was ending the 12-year run of Talk of the Nation on March 29, 2013, stating that Conan would "step away from the rigors of daily journalism." On February 12, 2014, an interview aired on KUAZ 89.1, Tucson, Arizona's NPR affiliate, where Conan explained that ending Talk of the Nation was not a decision he was involved in or agreed with, citing its status as one of NPR's most popular shows.  He went on to join Hawaii Public Radio as a news analyst on June 8, 2014. He produced a thrice-weekly series called Pacific News Minute between November 30, 2017 and October 31, 2019.

In January 2017, Conan launched a new radio show and podcast, Truth, Politics, and Power, focused on the Trump administration. Each week, Conan interviewed experts in depth about a different issue arising from the 2016 election and the President's administration. The radio show is distributed by PRX.

Personal life
In 1982, Conan married Liane Hansen. She was a long-time host of NPR's Weekend Edition Sunday.  Together, they had two children: Connor and Casey.  Hansen briefly co-hosted Talk of the Nation with Conan.  While on a farewell tour of NPR stations, Hansen revealed in April 2011 that she and Conan were divorcing.

He was later in a domestic partnership with American travel writer, poet, and essayist Gretel Ehrlich, who survives him. They married in 2019.

Conan moved to Hāwī on Hawaii island after he left NPR. He farmed macadamia nuts on 5.5 acres of land. He enjoyed scuba diving after he settled in Hawaii.

Conan was a friend of comics writer Chris Claremont. As a result, he was featured a number of times as a sympathetic journalist in stories Claremont wrote for Marvel and DC Comics, such as the 1988 X-Men storyline "The Fall of the Mutants".

Conan died on August 10, 2021, on his farm in Hāwī, Hawaii as a result of glioblastoma according to his son Connor Conan.  He was 71, and had been diagnosed with a glioblastoma on his 70th birthday in November 2019.

Awards
Major Armstrong Award
3 Alfred I. duPont-Columbia University Awards
George Foster Peabody Award 
During his time at All Things Considered, it won many awards as well, including the Washington Journalism Reviews Best in the Business Award.

Publications

References

External links
 
 Biography from NPR
 Biography from Hawaii Public Radio

1949 births
2021 deaths
American radio journalists
American reporters and correspondents
American talk radio hosts
Deaths from brain cancer in the United States
Deaths from glioblastoma
NPR personalities
Peabody Award winners
People from Beirut
Loomis Chaffee School alumni